Mikayla Dayes (born 29 September 1999) is a Canadian-born Jamaican footballer who plays as a forward for American collegiate team Maryland Terrapins and the Jamaica national team.

International career 
Dayes was a former Canada youth international and played at the 2016 FIFA U-17 Women's World Cup.

Dayes made her senior international debut for Jamaica on 13 June 2021.

References

External links 
 Maryland profile

1999 births
Living people
Citizens of Jamaica through descent
Jamaican women's footballers
Women's association football forwards
Maryland Terrapins women's soccer players
Jamaica women's international footballers
Jamaican expatriate women's footballers
Jamaican expatriate sportspeople in the United States
Expatriate women's soccer players in the United States
Soccer players from Toronto
Canadian women's soccer players
Canadian expatriate women's soccer players
Canadian expatriate sportspeople in the United States
Canadian sportspeople of Jamaican descent
Black Canadian women's soccer players